Marjory Heath Wentworth (born June 3, 1958) is an American poet. She was named by Governor Mark Sanford as the sixth South Carolina Poet Laureate in 2003.

Biography

Early life and education
Wentworth was born Marjory Heath on June 3, 1958, in Lynn, Massachusetts, and raised in nearby Swampscott. Her parents were John and Mary (Tully) Heath. As a child, she spent many years in and out of hospitals to correct some congenital organ anomalies. Adding further hardship was the fact that her father, John, a purchasing agent for Parker Brothers, died of leukemia when she was just 14 years old.

She graduated from Mount Holyoke College (where she majored in anthropology, political science, and dance) and went on to receive her M.A. in Writing from New York University (NYU). While at NYU, she studied under Galway Kinnell, Phil Levine, Joseph Brodsky, and Carolyn Forché. After Mount Holyoke, she did some studies at Oxford University.

Career
While still a graduate student at New York University, Wentworth worked in refugee resettlement with the United Nations High Commission on Refugees. She went on after graduating to work as a book publicist with Readers International, a branch of Amnesty International, interviewing with Brodsky for the job.

After moving to South Carolina with her husband in 1989, Wentworth began teaching both children and adults in the area. In 1993, she started teaching as an adjunct instructor at Trident Technical College in North Charleston, South Carolina. For many years she has conducted the "Expressions of Healing" class at Roper Hospital in Charleston. The class focuses on those affected by cancer. She also teaches at the Charleston County School of the Arts and the creative writing class at The Art Institute of Charleston. She is also president of the Lowcountry Initiative for the Literary Arts.

Wentworth and her husband Peter run Wentworth PR which manages public relations for publishers and authors such as Dottie Frank, Mary Alice Monroe, and Gary Smith.

Poet laureateship
Wentworth read the inaugural poem at Mark Sanford's first inauguration as Governor of South Carolina. Shortly thereafter, in 2003, he appointed her as the sixth South Carolina Poet Laureate. Usually given a small honorarium ($1,200) as poet laureate, this honorarium was cut by Sanford in 2003 when Wentworth agreed to serve without the pay. As poet laureate, Wentworth is on the board of directors of The Poetry Society of South Carolina.

Personal life
She is married to filmmaker Peter Wentworth and they have three sons. They were introduced by her brother, Jack, and were married soon after graduating from college, on June 27, 1981. The Wentworth family moved to Sullivan's Island, South Carolina, and lived there for many years, beginning in 1989. Shortly after relocating, though, Hurricane Hugo hit the area hard and they were unable to live in their house for nearly a year. It was during that time that their third child was born. Later, the family moved to nearby Mount Pleasant in 2004.

Wentworth is a close friend of former South Carolina first lady Jenny Sanford.

Awards and honors
 Pushcart Prize nominee several times.
 South Carolina Poet Laureate, 2003–present

Works
Wentworth's poetry collections include:
 
  Art by Mary Edna Fraser
 
 
 

Other works include:
  Illustrated by Leslie Darwin Pratt-Thomas

References

External links
 
Marjory Wentworth Collection - Furman University Special Collections

1958 births
Poets Laureate of South Carolina
American women poets
People from Lynn, Massachusetts
People from Mount Pleasant, South Carolina
New York University alumni
Mount Holyoke College alumni
Living people
Poets from South Carolina
21st-century American women